Milton Wilson House is a historic home located at Rushville in Yates County, New York. It is a Queen Anne style structure built about 1906.

It was listed on the National Register of Historic Places in 1994.

References

Houses on the National Register of Historic Places in New York (state)
Queen Anne architecture in New York (state)
Houses completed in 1906
Houses in Yates County, New York
National Register of Historic Places in Yates County, New York
1906 establishments in New York (state)